The Global Alliance to Prevent Prematurity and Stillbirth (GAPPS) was founded in 2007 as an initiative of Seattle Children’s, and is a 501(c)(3) nonprofit organization. GAPPS’ mission is to lead a collaborative, global effort to increase awareness and accelerate innovative research and interventions that will improve maternal, newborn and child health outcomes around the world, with a focus on preterm birth and stillbirth.

Initiatives 
GAPPS is a member of the Washington Global Health Alliance, and collaborates with a number of research universities, government agencies, non-governmental organizations and philanthropic foundations. Notable collaborators include the Centers for Disease Control and Prevention (CDC), Brigham and Women's Hospital, Harvard T.H. Chan School of Public Health, Johns Hopkins Bloomberg School of Public Health, London School of Hygiene and Tropical Medicine, the National Institutes of Health (NIH) and its foundation (FNIH), PATH, Queen's University at Kingston, UNICEF, University of Toronto and the World Health Organization.

GAPPS Repository 
The GAPPS Repository is an international biobank of pregnancy specimens matched with data from patient questionnaires and clinical history gathered during pregnancy and after birth. These unique data support ground-breaking research on pregnancy, including how pregnancy affects maternal and child health after delivery. The Repository is also available to researchers to study the fetal origins of persistent health problems like diabetes, obesity, and hypertension.

Preventing Preterm Birth initiative 
In 2011 the Bill & Melinda Gates Foundation provided $20 million to GAPPS for the Preventing Preterm Birth initiative, part of the foundation's Grand Challenges in Global Health. The Preventing Preterm Birth initiative focuses on finding new interventions to prevent premature birth and stillbirth by limiting infection and improving nutrition.

Every Preemie-SCALE 
In 2014 USAID awarded the Every Preemie-SCALE project to provide practical, catalytic and scalable approaches for expanding uptake of preterm birth and low birth weight interventions in 24 priority countries in Africa and Asia.

Nonprofit Rating
GAPPS has achieved the GuideStar Platinum Seal of Transparency for non-profit organizations.

References

External links
 

International medical and health organizations
Non-profit organizations based in Seattle
Obstetrics and gynaecology organizations
Stillbirth organizations
Preterm birth